American-born Chinese are the subset of Chinese Americans who were born in the US.

The term may also refer to:
 ABC (Jin album), a Cantonese language album by Chinese American rapper Jin, the name of which is the colloquially used acronym of "American-born Chinese"
 American Born Chinese (graphic novel), a graphic novel by Gene Yang
 American Born Chinese (TV series), an upcoming action-comedy television series